Maricich is a surname. Notable people with the surname include:

Juan Maricich (born 1972), Argentine slalom canoeist
Maria Maricich (born 1961), American alpine skier